This a list of dams and reservoirs that are located in the Indian state of Karnataka.

List with specifications

See also
List of dams and reservoirs in India

References

External links
Website of the Karnataka state Water Resources department
Water Resources of Karnataka

 
K 
Dams and reservoirs